Booponus is a genus of blow flies in the family Calliphoridae. Most species are endoparasites of large mammals.

Species
Booponus aldrichi Senior-White, 1940
Booponus borealis Rohdendorf, 1959
Booponus indicus (Austen, 1930)
Booponus inexspectatus (Grunin, 1947)
Booponus intonsus Aldrich, 1923
Booponus malayana Kurahashi, Benjaphong & Omar, 1997

References

Calliphoridae
Oestroidea genera
Taxa named by John Merton Aldrich
Endoparasites